HD 130458 (HR 5520) is a double star in the southern circumpolar constellation of Apus. The pair has a combined apparent magnitude of 5.8, making it faintly visible to the naked eye under ideal conditions.

The primary is a red giant with a stellar classification of G7 IIIa. It was earlier classified as G8 IIb, indicating a bright giant.The dimmer component has a stellar classification of F9 IV, indicating that it is an F-type subgiant evolving onto the red giant branch. As of 2008 , the pair has an angular separation of 2.167″.

At present the primary has 1.5 times the mass of the Sun but has expanded to 8.9 times its girth. It radiates at 55 times the luminosity of the Sun from its enlarged photosphere at an effective temperature 5,194 K, which gives it a yellow glow. HD 130458A is believed to be on the horizontal branch.

References

External links
 Image HD 130458

Apus (constellation)
130458
Double stars
G-type giants
5520
072833
Durchmusterung objects
Apodis, 17